Djokele Airport  is an airport serving Djokele, a village on the Fimi River in Mai-Ndombe Province, Democratic Republic of the Congo.

See also

Transport in the Democratic Republic of the Congo
List of airports in the Democratic Republic of the Congo

References

External links
OpenStreetMap - Djokele Airport

Airports in Mai-Ndombe Province